Arsen Tlekhugov (born 3 November 1976 in Urukh, Leskensky District) is a former Kazakhstani football forward who was born in Russia. He capped once for National team and was top scorer of Kazakhstan Super League twice.

Awards
 2001 Kazakhstan FF and Goal Journal "Best Player of the year"
 Kazakhstan Top scorer: 2001, 2004

Honours
 Kazakhstan League Champion: 2004
 Kazakhstan Cup Winner: 2002, 2003

External links

1976 births
Living people
People from Kabardino-Balkaria
Association football forwards
Kazakhstani footballers
Kazakhstan international footballers
PFC Spartak Nalchik players
Kazakhstani expatriate footballers
Expatriate footballers in Russia
FC Lokomotiv Nizhny Novgorod players
Russian Premier League players
FC Okzhetpes players
FC Kairat players
FC Zhenis Astana players
Buxoro FK players
Kazakhstan Premier League players
Expatriate footballers in Uzbekistan
FC Kristall Smolensk players
Sportspeople from Kabardino-Balkaria